Full Speed is the third studio album by American rapper Kid Ink. It was released on January 30, 2015, by RCA Records, distributed by these affiliated record labels Tha Alumni Music Group and 88 Classic. The album marks as the second release with the RCA Records. The album was supported by three singles: "Body Language" featuring Usher and Tinashe, "Hotel" featuring Chris Brown, and "Be Real" featuring Dej Loaf.

Following its release, the album was met with mixed reviews from music critics. The album debuted at number 14 on the Billboard 200, selling 29,000 copies in the United States, during its first week.

Singles
Kid Ink released the song, titled "Body Language", as the album's lead single on September 9, 2014. The track features a hook performed by American singer Usher and background vocals by a fellow R&B singer Tinashe. The song was produced by Cashmere Cat and Stargate.

"Hotel", which features the guest vocals from American recording artist Chris Brown, was made available to purchase on the iTunes Store on January 9, 2015. It was sent to US urban adult contemporary radio on January 27, 2015, as the album's second single. The song was produced by The Featherstones.

"Be Real", which features guest vocals from a fellow recording artist Dej Loaf, was sent to rhythmic contemporary radio on March 31, 2015, as the album's third single. The song's production was handled by DJ Mustard, while it co-produced by JGramm Beats.

"Dolo", which features guest vocals from American R&B singer R. Kelly, was sent to rhythmic contemporary radio on August 6, 2015, as the album's fourth single. The song's produced by Nic Nac and Mark Kragen.

Promotional singles
The album's first promotional single, titled "Cool Back" was made available to digital download on December 16, 2014, with album pre-orders on the iTunes Store. The song was produced by C.P Dubb.

The album's second promotional single, titled "Blunted" was made available to digital download, with album pre-orders on December 23, 2014. The song was produced by REO (written by Ramon Owen).

The album's third promotional single, "Like a Hott Boyy" featuring Young Thug and Bricc Baby Shitro, was made available to digital download on January 13, 2015. The song was produced by Metro Boomin and DJ Spinz.

Other songs
The track "Faster" was featured as the official theme song of WWE's pay-per-view; Fastlane. Kid ink is a long time fan of WWE.

Critical reception

At Metacritic, which assigns a normalized rating out of 100 to reviews from critics, the album received an average score of 55, based on 10 reviews, indicating "mixed or average reviews". Craig Jenkins of Billboard said "Ink has clearly studied his success, and it feels strategic that Full Speed is sardine-packed with star collaborators." In a similar review, Kellan Miller of HipHopDX said "Most of the songs on Full Speed are catchy in their own right, but on the heels of tracks that sound so much alike just now seeing their expiration on radio, the feeling is mixed at best."

Commercial performance
The album debuted at number 14 on the Billboard 200, selling 29,000 copies in the United States. In its second week, the album dropped down to number 41 on the chart, selling 8,000 copies, bringing total album sales to 37,000 copies. In the third week, the album dropped down to number 51 on the chart, selling 5,000 copies, bringing the total album sales to 42,000 copies.

Track listing

Notes
  signifies a co-producer
  signifies an additional producer
 "Faster" contains a portion of the composition "A Face That Doesn't Matter", written by Linda Hargrove and Mark Ellerbee.
 "Hotel" contains a portion of the composition "Paranoid", written by Bobby Simmons, Jr., Tyrone Griffin, Jr., Dijon McFarlane and Clarence Montgomery III.
 "About Mine" contains a portion of the composition "Why U Bullshittin'", written by David Blake and Dejuan Walker.

Charts

Weekly charts

Year-end charts

Release history

References

External links
 http://kidinkfullspeed.com/

2015 albums
Kid Ink albums
Albums produced by Stargate
Albums produced by Metro Boomin
Albums produced by DJ Dahi
Albums produced by DJ Mustard
Albums produced by Cashmere Cat
Albums produced by Key Wane